Anumol   is an Indian actress, predominantly acting in Malayalam and Tamil films. She appeared in Malayalam movies such as Chayilyam (2014), Ivan Megharoopan (2012), Akam (2011), Vedivazhipadu (2013) and Jamna Pyari (2015).Her performance as Kuruvammal in 2023 Tamil web-series Ayali applauded by Critics and Audience.

Film career 
Starting her film career with the Tamil movies Kannukkulle, Ramar and Sooran, Anumol forayed into Malayalam cinema with P. Balachandran's Ivan Megharoopan, a biopic based on the poet P. Kunhiraman Nair. She portrayed Thankamony.

She was also in the film Akam, an adaptation of Malayattoor Ramakrishnan's novel Yakshi.

Debutant director Manoj Kana's Chayilyam was about the plight of a hapless widow who is denied the freedom to lead a normal life by society. In the movie, Anumol player the character Gauri, who had eloped with her lover and then returned with her son into her in-laws' home, after the death of her husband. Her father-in-law had brought them back, but orthodox society was against this. The resistance ends when the people around start visualizing her as the incarnation of a Goddess. The story is narrated with the traditional folk art form Theyyam as the backdrop. Gauri wants to lead the rest of her life as a mother and as a woman, but the image of a Goddess is thrust upon her.  The whole film is focused on the character played by Anumol and the actor has delivered a matured performance. The dedication of the actor is there to be seen in most frames.

Anumol has filmed Njan, a film by Ranjith.

In Rockstar, directed by V. K. Prakash, the motorcycle enthusiast and rider, Anumol played a tomboy character riding a 500 cc Royal Enfield bullet motorcycle at 130 km/h for the role of Sanjana Kurien, a fashion photographer.

In the movie Nilaavariyaathe, a movie about caste discrimination and barriers that existed in Kerala a century ago, set in the backdrop of Kasaragod District in North Malabar region of Kerala, Anumol did an exceptionally brilliant portrayal as Paatta, the heroine, who is an advocate against casteism and untouchability.

In the movie Premasuthram, directed by Jiju Ashokan, Anumol plays a character called Manju Rani, a tailor in the movie. It is the first time Anumol is handling an out-and-out peppy character. Again marked by a brilliant portrayal, Anumol's character runs a local tailoring shop in a rural pocket in the movie.

In the biopic movie Padmini, which portrays the life of a genius female painter T. K. Padmini from Kerala, Anumol takes the lead to portray Padmini. The biopic goes through the struggle she faced throughout her life to achieve her path. The movie portrays the struggles Padmini had to face as art was prohibited for women from good families at that time. It discusses the obstacles she had to overcome in order to get an education and to indulge in art. T. K. Padmini was one of the rarest from her category, as there are only a few women painters from Kerala.  Anumol's exceptionally brilliant and ingenious portrayal by living the character herself is the mark of this movie.

Performing arts career 
Anumol is a well known Kathakali and Bharathnatyam dancer.  Speaking on how she developed a passion for acting, Anumol says that it was ballet that attracted her to the world of glitz and glam.

YouTube Channel 
Anumol, who is also a travel fanatic and a very expert driver, launched her YouTube channel, 'Anu Yathra'. It was launched by actor Dulquer Salman. It includes videos of Anumol's travels and her other interests like dance, reading, driving, and riding. "I am already jealous of Anumol after seeing her travel videos and driving prowess. It was my all-time dream to do a similar channel", said Dulquer Salman.

"I love to act, travel and speak, so I decided to blend all my interests and do something. It was the basic idea from which the YouTube channel was born", said Anumol.

Awards 

 Monisha Award 2015
 Santhadevi Puraskaram 2015
 N P Abu Memorial Award 2014
 Jaycey foundation Award 2012
 Jaycey foundation Award 2014
 Bharat Murali Award 2013
 AT Abu award 2012
 Surya TV award 2012
 Jury Special Mention: For the role in Akam
Nominated : 10th South Indian International Movie Awards - Best Supporting Actress - Malayalam for Paapam Cheyyathavar Kalleriyatte, 2021

Filmography

Television
 8pm (Kairali we TV)
 Vanitha Ratnam (Amrita TV)
 Red Carpet (Amrita TV)
 Bzinga (Zee Keralam)

Web-series
 2023 : Ayali
 TBA  : Mindscapes

Online
 Anuyathra: Anuyathra is a popular vlog by Anumol.

References

External links 
 Official Facebook Page
 

Actresses from Kerala
Living people
Actresses in Malayalam cinema
Indian film actresses
People from Palakkad district
21st-century Indian actresses
Indian television actresses
Actresses in Malayalam television
1986 births